Below is a list of hypergeometric identities.

Hypergeometric function lists identities for the Gaussian hypergeometric function
Generalized hypergeometric function lists identities for more general hypergeometric functions
Wilf–Zeilberger pair is a method for proving hypergeometric identities

References

Hypergeometric functions